Madhya Pradesh State Highway 7 (MP SH 7) is a State Highway running from Morwan till the Madhya Pradesh - Rajasthan border near Jhalawar.

It connects the towns of Neemuch, Manasa in Madhya Pradesh to Jhalawar city in Rajasthan.

See also
List of state highways in Madhya Pradesh

References

State Highways in Madhya Pradesh